Father of the Bride is a 2022 American romantic comedy film directed by Gaz Alazraki and written by Matt Lopez, based on the 1949 novel of the same name by Edward Streeter. The film stars Andy García, Gloria Estefan, Adria Arjona, Isabela Merced, Diego Boneta, and Chloe Fineman. It is the third filmed version of the story, after the original 1950 film and the 1991 remake. Produced by Plan B Entertainment, it was released on June 16, 2022, by Warner Bros. Pictures and HBO Max.

Plot
Renowned architect Billy Herrera and his wife Ingrid are a Miami-based Cuban-American couple with two daughters, recent law school graduate Sofia and rebellious aspiring fashion designer Cora. 

At couples' counseling, Ingrid tells Billy that she has had enough of his workaholic attitude and stubbornness and wants a divorce; their counselor tells them to tell their daughters right away. Ingrid wants to announce it later that day after Sofia arrives for a visit, but Sofia first announces that she is engaged to be married to fellow lawyer Adan Castillo and that they want to marry in one month. 

Billy and Ingrid agree to keep their divorce a secret until after the wedding. He is hesitant about Sofia's nuptials and her desire to move to Mexico with Adan to work at a non-profit instead of remaining in the United States. 

Billy disagrees with the couple as he wants a big, traditional Cuban wedding while Sofia and Adan want a smaller ceremony. Meanwhile, Sofia asks Cora to make her wedding gown and her bridesmaids' dresses, disgruntling their eccentric wedding planner Natalie Vance.

Adan's wealthy father Hernan and the rest of his family arrive in Miami. He and Billy disagree further on the cost and scale of the wedding; Hernan offends him by offering to pay for what Billy cannot afford. He then throws a lavish engagement party on his yacht instead. 

Hernan has also obtained a lavish mansion on a Miami island and offers to host the wedding there, causing a shouting match between him and Billy, who admits his dislike of Adan and his family. Billy appeases Sofia at her dress fitting and confides the divorce to Adan at the latter's bachelor party.

A storm warning threatens the upcoming ceremony. The families proceed to the wedding rehearsal, where Cora overhears Billy talking about the divorce to his cousin Junior and immediately breaks the news to the rest of the guests. Sofia is disgusted that her parents and Adan have been hiding it from her, but reconciles once more with her father and agrees to push through with the wedding. That stormy night, the Herrera family spends the night together.

The next day, the weather has cleared, but the storm has collapsed the only bridge to the wedding venue and has destroyed much of the set-up. The Herreras and Castillos pool their resources to throw the wedding last-minute at the Herrera home, with Natalie officiating. Sofia and Adan marry with Billy's full approval, while Billy and Ingrid rekindle their romance.

Cast
 Andy García as Billy Herrera
 Gloria Estefan as Ingrid Herrera 
 Emily Estefan as young Ingrid Herrera 
 Adria Arjona as Sofia Herrera 
 Isabela Merced as Cora Herrera 
 Diego Boneta as Adan Castillo
 Chloe Fineman as Natalie Vance
 Casey Thomas Brown as Kyler 
 Pedro Damián as Hernan Castillo
 Ana Fabrega as Vanessa
 Enrique Murciano as Junior
 Laura Harring as Marcela Castillo
 Ruben Rabasa as Tio Walter
 Marta Velasco as Caridad "Chi Chi" Gonzalez
 Macarena Achaga as Julieta Castiilo
 Matt Walsh as Dr. Gary Saeger
 Sean Patrick Dawson as Junior Jr.
 Ho-Kwan Tse as Huan
 Angela Alvarez - as Tia Pili

Production
In September 2020, it was announced that a Latin adaptation of Father of the Bride centred around Cuban-Americans is in development at Warner Bros. Pictures with a script written by Matt Lopez. In February 2021, it was announced that Gaz Alazraki has been set to direct the film. In March 2021, Andy Garcia was announced to star as the titular character. In April 2021, Adria Arjona, Gloria Estefan, Isabela Merced were cast, with Diego Boneta, Enrique Murciano and Macarena Achaga joining the film in May. In June 2021, Chloe Fineman and Ana Fabrega joined the cast of the film, with the film now being produced by Warner Bros. Pictures and distributed by HBO Max.

Principal photography began on June 22, 2021, in Atlanta, Georgia.

Release
It was released on June 16, 2022, on HBO Max.

Reception

References

External links
 
 

Father of the Bride (franchise)
2022 comedy-drama films
2020s English-language films
American comedy-drama films
Films about father–daughter relationships
Films based on American novels
Films scored by Terence Blanchard
Films set in Miami
Films shot in Atlanta
HBO Max films
Plan B Entertainment films
Warner Bros. films
2020s American films